Magomed Kurbanovich Azizov (born 12 May 1969 in Makhachkala) is a Russian of Avar descent former wrestler who competed in the 1992 Summer Olympics and in the 1996 Summer Olympics.

World Champion 1994 and three time European Champion. He is former member of Dynamo Wrestling Club.

References

External links
 

1969 births
Living people
Sportspeople from Makhachkala
Soviet male sport wrestlers
Olympic wrestlers of the Unified Team
Olympic wrestlers of Russia
Wrestlers at the 1992 Summer Olympics
Wrestlers at the 1996 Summer Olympics
Russian male sport wrestlers
Avar people
World Wrestling Champions
World Wrestling Championships medalists